Yudu may refer to:

Yudu County in the south of Jiangxi province, China
Qiemo Yudu Airport, in Qiemo Town, Xinjiang Uyghur Autonomous Region, China
 Yudu (festival), summer festival in the Korean calendar